Verninac is a French surname. Notable people with the surname include:

Charles de Verninac (1841–1901), French politician who was a Senator from 1883 until his death in 1901
Charles Étienne Raymond Victor de Verninac (1803–1834), French diplomat
Henriette de Verninac (1780–1827), subject of a well-known neo-classical portrait by Jacques-Louis David
Raymond de Verninac Saint-Maur (1762–1822), French diplomat
Raymond-Jean-Baptiste de Verninac Saint-Maur (1794–1873), Minister of the Navy and Colonies and an Admiral

 
French-language surnames